Sandra Naranjo Bautista (born 1985, Ambato) is an Ecuadorian politician and economist.

Education
Naranjo studied at the Universidad San Francisco de Quito, has a diploma from the Latin American Social Sciences Institute, and a master's degree in public administration and international development from Harvard University's John F. Kennedy School of Government.

Career
Naranjo served as Ecuador's Minister of Tourism from June 2014 to October 2015 and then as the national secretary of planning and development. On January 4, 2017, Naranjo became interim Vice President of Ecuador by President Rafael Correa's Executive Order 1291 when the incumbent Jorge Glas was given leave without pay.

Citations

Living people
1985 births
People from Ambato, Ecuador
Women government ministers of Ecuador
21st-century Ecuadorian economists
Ecuadorian women economists
Tourism ministers of Ecuador
Universidad San Francisco de Quito alumni
Harvard Kennedy School alumni
21st-century Ecuadorian women politicians
21st-century Ecuadorian politicians